Mooste Parish was a rural municipality of Estonia, in Põlva County. It had a population of 1542 (as of 1 January 2009) and an area of 185.12 km².

Settlements
Small borough
Mooste
Villages
Jaanimõisa - Kaaru - Kadaja - Kanassaare - Kastmekoja - Kauksi - Laho - Rasina - Säässaare - Säkna - Savimäe - Suurmetsa - Terepi - Viisli

References

External links
 

 
Former municipalities of Estonia

ro:Mooste